Sidydrassus is a genus of ground spiders that was first described by S. L. Esyunin & T. K. Tuneva in 2002.  it contains only three species: S. rogue, S. shumakovi, and S. tianschanicus.

References

Araneomorphae genera
Gnaphosidae
Spiders of Asia
Spiders of Russia